The following is a list of Oricon number-one singles of 2020.

Chart history

See also
List of Oricon number-one albums of 2020

References

2020 in Japanese music
Japan Oricon Singles
Lists of number-one songs in Japan